Stanley Bernard Stephen Samuel (born 10 March 1986) is a retired professional Malaysian footballer who last played for Kuala Lumpur and has represented the Malaysia national team. He also been played in India and had an underwent trials with Indonesia club. He currently works as a football pundit and match commentator for Asian broadcasters Astro SuperSport and Astro Arena. He also is currently the CEO of Kuala Lumpur City Football Club.

Career

Kuala Lumpur FA
Growing up in Kuala Lumpur, Stanley was a prodigy from the elite Bukit Jalil Sports School. At the age of 18 he made his debut with Kuala Lumpur FA in the second tier, Malaysian Premier League. He played for Kuala Lumpur FA for 5 seasons. In the 2008 Malaysia Cup group stage, Stanley was top scorer with 5 goals in 6 matches.

Perak UPB My/Team
Stanley moved to UPB-MyTeam in 2009, scoring 12 goals in 28 appearances in the Malaysian Super League, FA Cup and Malaysia Cup. In the same year, Stanley made his debut for the Malaysia U-23 team and also earned his 1st caps for the full national side.

Sporting Clube de Goa
Stanley was offered a trial at Indian League (I-League) team Sporting Clube de Goa in November 2009. His trial was successful and he signed for them mid-season as one of the two AFC import player quota. He became the first Malaysian to play his trade in the I-league.  When Stanley signed, Sporting were facing relegation, sitting at the bottom of the 2009–10 I-League table with just one win from 13 matches. In the second half of the season Sporting managed 5 wins out of 13 matches and Stanley contributed 5 goals in 14 matches in all competitions including 2010 Indian Federation Cup Qualifying final play-offs. However,  he was released at the end of the season due to new regulations that took away the quota for AFC foreign players at Indian clubs.

Sabah FA
After a successful trial in Indonesia, Stanley was offered a contract at Indonesian Super League (ISL) outfit Persibo Bojonegoro. He scored on his debut in the pre-season Java Cup but due to political tensions between Malaysia and Indonesia, Stanley’s deal fell through. Instead he joined East Malaysian club, Sabah FA, for the 2011 Malaysian Super League season under coach Gary Phillips.

Kuala Lumpur FA
In 2012, Stanley rejoined his first senior club, Kuala Lumpur FA. But towards the end of the season, he suffered a double fracture of the tibia, which put his professional career in doubt, eventually leading to his retirement at the early age of 26 after unsuccessful attempts at a comeback.

International career
Stanley first represented his country as a 12-year-old in 1998. He would play numerous times for various age group sides, including the Malaysian Under-20 team in 2004-2005 under Jordan Viera and the Malaysian Under-23s in 2009. Later that year, he played for the senior national side for the first time. He earned his first full caps in two games against Zimbabwe and would also face regional rivals Indonesia. He was also in the 23-man squad for two friendlies against touring Manchester United in July 2009, coming off the bench in both games.

Broadcasting career
In 2012, Stanley made increasingly regular guest appearances for Astro SuperSport on the popular Bola@Mamak programme, which was nominated for Best Talk Show in the Asian Television Awards. From August 2013, he contributed as a pundit on SuperSport’s English Premier League coverage and was a regular guest on the FourFourTwo Snapshot radio show on LiteFM in Malaysia. Stanley also works regularly as a co-commentator for the coverage on Astro Arena of the Malaysia Super League.

KL City F.C. Management
On 13 December 2020, Stanley was appointed by his former club as the CEO of Kuala Lumpur City FC. After one year Stanley joined KL City management, the club had won 2021 Malaysia Cup. Thus,  winning the cup for the first time in 32 years.

References

External links
 

1986 births
Living people
Malaysian people of Indian descent
Malaysian footballers
Sportspeople from Kuala Lumpur
Malaysia international footballers
Malaysian expatriate footballers
Malaysian expatriate sportspeople in India
Expatriate footballers in India
I-League players
Association football forwards
Kuala Lumpur City F.C. players